This is a list of releases on the Sumerian Records label.

Current artists

After the Burial

Animals as Leaders

Asking Alexandria

Betraying the Martyrs

Body Count

Borgore

Born of Osiris 

Add Soul Sphere and The Simulation

Dead Letter Circus

The Dillinger Escape Plan

Evan Brewer

The Faceless

The Francesco Artusato Project

The HAARP Machine

I See Stars

I, the Breather

Mestis

Periphery

Stick to Your Guns

Stray from the Path

TRAM

Upon a Burning Body

Veil of Maya

Various artists

Former artists

ABACABB

Agraceful

Bizzy Bone

Blackguard

Broadcast the Nightmare

Capture the Crown

Circle of Contempt

Conducting from the Grave

Creature Feature

Enfold Darkness

Fellsilent

Kenotia

Lower than Atlantis

Make Me Famous

Sea of Treachery

Structures

Too Pure to Die

References 

Discographies of American record labels